Sociedade Anónima Desportiva ("Public limited sports company") is a special type of public limited company (SA) in Portugal. The new legal status was introduced in the early 1990s to improve financial management and transparency in sports clubs. Many Portuguese football and basketball clubs add the suffix SAD to the end of their official name.

See also 
 List of football clubs in Portugal
 Sociedad Anónima Deportiva

References 

Law of Portugal
Sports organisations of Portugal
Sports terminology
Corporate law
Legal entities
Types of business entity